The International Solar Energy Society (ISES) is a global organization for promoting the development and utilisation of renewable energy. ISES is a UN-accredited NGO headquartered in Freiburg im Breisgau, Germany. Dr David S. Renné is the current president.

ISES was formed in 1954 as a worldwide non-profit organisation dedicated to the advancement of the utilisation of solar energy.  ISES is now active in over 110 countries worldwide.  Its members include scientists and researchers, plus many others from industry, solar energy associations and other private and public organisations.

ISES also organizes Young ISES, a network of students and young professional ISES members connecting young solar professionals worldwide.

Aims 
ISES aims to help its global members provide the technical answers needed to accelerate the transformation to 100% renewable energy. This is reflected in the society's official vision statement:The International Solar Energy Society (ISES) envisions a world with 100% renewable energy for everyone used wisely and efficiently. ISES aims to bring recent developments in solar energy, both in research and applications, to the attention of decision makers and the general public, in order to increase the understanding and use of this non-polluting resource in everyday life.

Through its events and publications, ISES promotes research, development, and use of technologies which are directly or indirectly fuelled by the sun. These technologies can provide sustainable solutions for the supply of energy in both industrialised and developing countries. 
In spite of a historic focus on direct solar energy, ISES today is involved in all renewable energy fields.

Partnerships 
ISES is a member of the International Renewable Energy Alliance (REN Alliance).  Other members include the International Geothermal Association (IGA), International Hydropower Association (IHA), World Bioenergy Association (WBA) and the World Wind Energy Association (WWEA).

Publications 
ISES is the publisher of several publications including Renewable Energy Focus, the scientific journal Solar Energy and various white papers. ISES also operates an online bookshop which includes conference proceedings, pocket reference books and others.

National sections

The ISES Sections are organisations working at the national or regional level and represent the international organisation at this level.  Members are encouraged to be involved with the Sections in their area.

See also
Energy & Environment
Journal of Renewable and Sustainable Energy
Renewable and Sustainable Energy Reviews

References

Further reading
Clean Tech Nation: How the U.S. Can Lead in the New Global Economy (2012) by Ron Pernick and Clint Wilder
Deploying Renewables 2011 (2011) by the International Energy Agency
Reinventing Fire: Bold Business Solutions for the New Energy Era (2011) by Amory Lovins
Renewable Energy Sources and Climate Change Mitigation (2011) by the IPCC
Solar Energy Perspectives (2011) by the International Energy Agency

External links
International Solar Energy Society
ISES Online Bookshop
American Solar Energy Society

International renewable energy organizations
Solar energy organizations
Freiburg im Breisgau